Anna Barbara “Bobbie” Hantz Marconi (born February 12, 1956) is a justice of the New Hampshire Supreme Court. Marconi was appointed to the court by Governor Chris Sununu in 2017.

Early life and education 
Marconi earned a Bachelor of Arts degree in Political Science in 1977 from the University of New Hampshire and a Juris Doctor in 1992 from Chicago-Kent College of Law. From 1982 until 1984, she served as executive director of the Republican State Committee of New Hampshire and worked on several political campaigns.

Professional career 
Marconi served as a law clerk for Maine Supreme Judicial Court Justices Caroline Glassman and Robert B. Clifford. In 2005, she became a member of the Judicial Selection Commission of New Hampshire. Marconi was also a shareholder at Sheehan, Phinney, Bass & Green, P.A., working mainly on civil litigation.

On June 6, 2017, Governor Chris Sununu announced Marconi as his nominee to New Hampshire Supreme Court, replacing retiring Justice Carol Ann Conboy. She was confirmed for the position by State Executive Council on June 21 and was sworn in on August 8.

Personal life
Marconi and her husband Geno Marconi live in Stratham, New Hampshire.

References

External links 
 Supreme Court - Associate Justice Anna Barbara Hantz Marconi

1956 births
Living people
21st-century American judges
Chicago-Kent College of Law alumni
New Hampshire Republicans
Justices of the New Hampshire Supreme Court
People from Stratham, New Hampshire
People from York, Pennsylvania
University of New Hampshire alumni
21st-century American women judges